Monschau is a small resort town in the Eifel region of western Germany, located in the Aachen district of North Rhine-Westphalia.

Geography
The town is located in the hills of the North Eifel, within the Hohes Venn – Eifel Nature Park in the narrow valley of the Rur river.
The historic town center has many preserved half-timbered houses and narrow streets have remained nearly unchanged for 300 years, making the town a popular tourist attraction nowadays. An open-air, classical music festival is staged annually at Burg Monschau. Historically, the main industry of the town was cloth-mills.

History

On the heights above the city is Monschau castle, which dates back to the 13th century — the first mention of Monschau was made in 1198. Beginning in 1433, the castle was used as a seat of the dukes of Jülich. In 1543, Emperor Charles V besieged it as part of the Guelders Wars, captured it and plundered the town. However, the castle stayed with Jülich until 1609, when it became part of Palatinate-Neuburg.

In 1795, the French captured the area and, under the name Montjoie, made it the capital of a canton of the Roer département. After the area became part of the Kingdom of Prussia in 1815, Monschau became the district capital of the Kreis Montjoie.

During World War I, some people argued that Monschau (or "Montjoie" as it was then still called) should be annexed to Belgium since they believed it historically to be a Walloon area that had been Germanized by the Prussians.

In 1918, William II, German Emperor, changed the name to Monschau. In 1972, the town was enlarged with the previously independent municipalities of Höfen, Imgenbroich, Kalterherberg, Konzen, Mützenich and Rohren. Mützenich, to the west of the town center, is an exclave of German territory surrounded by Belgium. It is separated from Germany by the Vennbahn railway line, which was assigned to Belgium by the Treaty of Versailles in 1919.

During World War II the town of Monschau, sitting on a vital road network, was a point of great tactical importance in the opening phase of the Battle of the Bulge in December 1944 as the northernmost point of the battlefront.

Economy

Tourism
Monschau, which is allowed to call itself health resort Luftkurort since 1996, attracts many visitors with its picturesque views especially in the warm months. Set in the medieval town facility that is traversed by the river Rur, it is dominated by slate paneled and Tudor style houses with cafes, restaurants, craft and souvenir shops. Parking places are placed around the city center.

Part of driving and physical chase scenes in the 2016 film: "Collide" were filmed in and around the centre of Monschau.

Attractions

Events
Known far beyond the environment are the  Monschau Klassik  in the Monschauer castle, and the Monschau Christmas market, which is visited every year by tens of thousands of guests.

 The  Arts and Culture Centre Monschau  (KUK) shows changing art exhibitions

Museums

 Red House, Foundation-Scheibler Museum: The museums shows the civil living culture between the 18th and 19th centuries. 1768 the double house was completed. Johann Heinrich Scheibler (1705-1765), the owner had brought the Monschau cloth industry to full success. The highlight of the equipment is the wooden staircase in the house.  
 Caffee roasting Wilhelm Maassen, founded in 1862. There is roasted coffee in old family tradition on an old PROBAT drum roaster. You can watch the roasting.
 Brewery Museum Felsenkeller, 150 years of brewing in the historical Monschau brewery, collection of old brewery equipment.
 Senfmühle Monschau, built in 1882.
 Erlebnismuseum Lernort natur: Since 2014, Museum of the  stuffed animals

Buildings

Monschau has over 330 listed buildings, so that only a selection can be called.
 Monschau Castle
 The Protestant Stadtkirche Monschau was built from 1787 to 1789 by Wilhelm Hellwig as a rectangular quarry stone and completed in 1810. 
 The Red House of the cloth manufacturers family Scheibler is accessible as a museum today. It is a duplex and was completed in 1768 by Johann Heinrich Scheibler (1705-1765), 
 House Troistorff was built in 1783 for the couple Troistorff as a representative town house. It has long been attributed to the Aachen architect Jakob Couven, but this is unlikely.
 St. Mariä Geburt (Monschau) in the style of peasant Baroque, built from 1649 to 1650, an erected in crude rubble masonry Saalbau, with a slightly curved gable roof. Instead of a tower, the church has a ridge turret with a pointed roof. The church is considered as the most beautiful building in the peasant Baroque in the northern Eifel

Supraregional sport
At two meetings in the spring meet canoeists for about 50 years in Monschau international events, and a whitewater races. 
Nationally known is the Monschau Marathon more than 760 meters of altitude, which takes place in August.

Infrastructure

Transportation
Monschau is connected by various regional bus routes of Regionalverkehr Euregio Maas-Rhein inter alia to Simmerath, Aachen and Eupen (Belgium). It is the collective tarif of the Aachener Verkehrsverbund. All lines meet at the central station Imgenbroich Bushof.  Since March 2016 runs in Monschau an additional responsive demand transport system of the Aachener Straßenbahn und Energieversorgung under the name NetLiner.

The former important Vennbahn, which was used until 2001 as a Heritage railway, had stations in Monschau, Konzen and Kaltenherberg, now it is  closed. It was remodeled 2010 for the establishment of the Vennbahn (bike path). Through the village runs the Bundesstraße 258 from north to south.

Biking trails
Through the town lead the cycle paths:
 Eifel Höhen Route, which leads the circuit around the Eifel National Park;
 RurUfer Radweg, which is the highest elevation of the High Fens with the mouth of the Rur in the Maas.
 Vennbahn (bike path) on the old Vennbahn track between Aachen and Luxembourg.

Notable residents
 Christian Urhan (1790–1845), violin player and composer
 Johann Heinrich Kurtz (1809–1890), lutheran theologian
 Karl Wilhelm Scheibler (1820–1881), industrialist.
 Elwin Bruno Christoffel (1829–1900), physicist and mathematician.
 Vincent Weber, (1902-1990), painter
 Mario Theissen (1952), former BMW Motorsport Director.

Literature 
 Wendt, Christoph: Monschau – Idylle zwischen Fels und Fachwerk. Meyer und Meyer, Aachen 1995, .
 Pippke, Walter, Pallhuber, Ida: Die Eifel. 2. Auflage. Köln 1984 (DuMont Kunst-Reiseführer), S. 42, Farbtafel 13, Abb. 27.

Gallery

References

External links

 
 Official site 
 Official site of Monschau Music Festival  
 Official site for the borough of Höfen 
 IMDB site for the film Collide 

 
Aachen (district)
Districts of the Rhine Province